Stepanovo is a rural locality (a village) in Shelotskoye Rural Settlement, Verkhovazhsky District, Vologda Oblast, Russia. The population was 35 as of 2002.

Geography 
Stepanovo is located 58 km southwest of Verkhovazhye (the district's administrative centre) by road. Shelota is the nearest rural locality.

References 

Rural localities in Verkhovazhsky District